Anders Björkman is a Swedish ski-orienteering competitor and world champion. He won a gold medal in the classic distance at the World Ski Orienteering Championships in Skellefteå in 1990. He received individual bronze medals in 1988 and 1990.

References

Year of birth missing (living people)
Living people
Swedish orienteers
Male orienteers
Ski-orienteers
20th-century Swedish people